Barm Shur-e Sofla (also Romanized as Barm Shūr-e Soflá; also known as Bameru, Barm-e Shūr-e Pā’īn, Barm Shūr, and Barm Shūr-e Pā’īn) is a village in Qarah Bagh Rural District, in the Central District of Shiraz County, Fars Province, Iran. At the 2006 census, its population was 444, in 97 families.

References 

Populated places in Shiraz County